The 2009 series of Norske Talenter was the first series of this television programme. It began airing on TV 2 February 13, 2009 with audition in Bergen, and the live final was held May 8, 2009. The winners this season, was the hip hop dance crew Quick Style at the ages 17–18. Runner-up became 14-year-old classical singer Lydia Hoen Tjore and 6-year old magician Brian Aksnes Hoseth finished in third place.

Judges and hosts
Judges:
Jan Fredrik Karlsen (music producer, was a judge in Norwegian Idol many of the seasons and is going to be a judge in X Factor: Norway)
Mia Gundersen (actress and singer)
Thomas Giertsen (actor and stand-up comedian)
Presenters (hosts):
Pia Lykke
Sturla Berg-Johansen

Auditions
Dates auditions were sent on TV:
February 13 (Bergen): Absence & Blipp
February 20 (Bergen): Lydia Hoen Tjore, René Skar
February 27 (Oslo): Quick, Sebastian James Hekneby
March 6 (Oslo): Røa Eldresenter
March 13 (Trondheim): Aaro Petrus Kontio, Håkon Ricardo
March 20 (Trondheim): Brian Aksnes Hoseth

Semi-finalists

Semi-finals

Final

Buzzers
Semi-final 2: Alexander got 2 buzzers (Jan Fredrik Karlsen and Thomas Giertsen)
Semi-final 4: Christer and Pål got all the judges' buzzers

Judges' choices

Finalists

Absence & Blipp
Absence & Blipp (Absence Crew) is a dance crew with a beatboxer. The dance crew is called Absence and the beatboxer called Blipp. Members: Stian "Blipp" Glopholm (beatboxer), Ole Petter "Hoolio" Knarvik, Piero "Piero the Hero" Issa, Andreas "Rocks" Roksvåg and Christopher "Birdy" Bottolfsen. They were absent in Dansefeber (season 2) when Knarvik, Issa and Roksvåg made it to the Fever Days. Only Knarvik made it to the live shows and finished in 10th place. The ages in the crew is 18–24. In the final, they was unhappy with the sound, because TV 2 made a mistake. They had to perform 15 seconds without sound.

Lydia
Lydia Hoen Tjore (14) is a classical singer. She came runner-up in the competition. She is from Radøy in Bergen and has a little brother, David, who also tried for Norske Talenter, but didn't make it to the semi-finals. Lydia was in the 3rd semi-final where she didn't got thru. She was picked to be in the wild cards, and then she won the public vote and got to the final.

Brian
6-year old Brian Aksnes Hoseth is the youngest contestant in the competition and is a magician. Now he has sold an own magician set for children. Brian's father, Boje Hoseth, came to the semi-finals last year with Håvard Sand where they called themselves Magic Touch. This inspired Brian to try in the competition.

Røa Eldresenter
Røa Eldresenter is the oldest in the competition, along with Bergens Munnspillorkester. The front artist Mette is 69, and the others in the ages 71–83. They are in the Røa older senter in Oslo. Many young people shows respect for them. They are a rap group with only Mette rapping and the others standing and being cool.

Håkon Ricardo
Håkon Ricardo Storstadmo became an opera singer at the age of 13. When he tried for the show, he was 13. He comes from Vuku in Verdal in Nord- Trøndelag, Norway. He was born in the Philippines. He sings arias in Italian language mostly. He wants to perform in large venues and sing opera to the people and make it more popular.

René
René Skar (24) is a rapper from Fyllingsdalen in Bergen. Sams.B makes the beats. René (aka RudeRen) and Stig (aka Sams.B) has a duo name called The D-Techs. René previously belonged to the rap crew CrippleCrew. René has a son named Shawn-Kevin. René wants him to be a doctor or something important. René wants to show him that nothing is impossible. René's good word for him is Sky Is the Limit.

Aaro
Aaro Petrus Kontio (24) is a diabolo artist. In the final, he diaboloed with 4 diabolos. Aaro comes from Finland, but lives now in Trondheim. Aaro got to the auditions together with his girlfriend from Finland, Tiina. She auditioned, with the circus talent trapes. She didn't make it to the semi-finals, but Aaro did. Aaro always performs his diabolo routines to rock/punk music.

Quick Style

Quick Style (17-18), a dance group with 3 Hip Hop dancers and a B-Boy. They ended up as winners of the competition.

Sebastian
Sebastian James Hekneby (18) is a singer. He is a big fan of Michael Jackson. He did some MJ dance moves in the final. In the final, TV 2 made a mistake with the sound, that sounded like he was screaming at the middle of the song. At the auditions, Jan Fredrik Karlsen said "Now, a new star is born on that stage" when he sang "You Raise Me Up". At the semi-finals he sang "Unchained Melody" and "One Moment in Time" in the final.

References

2009 Norwegian television seasons
Norske Talenter